This Is London may refer to:

thisislondon.co.uk, a website belonging to the London Evening Standard
"This is London" or "This is London Calling", an opening message on the BBC World Service
This Is London, a 1983 album by the band The Times
This Is London, a book in the This Is... travel book series

See also
So This Is London (disambiguation)